is a railway station in Asakuchi, Okayama Prefecture, Japan, operated by West Japan Railway Company (JR West).

Lines
Kamogata Station is served by the Sanyō Main Line.

Adjacent stations

See also
 List of railway stations in Japan

External links

  

Railway stations in Okayama Prefecture
Sanyō Main Line
Railway stations in Japan opened in 1891